Aosta railway station is the main station serving the city and comune of Aosta, in the autonomous region of Aosta Valley, northwestern Italy.  Opened in 1886, it forms part of the Chivasso–Ivrea–Aosta railway, and is also a junction station for a branch line to nearby Pré-Saint-Didier, in the Valdigne, on the way towards Courmayeur.

The station is currently managed by Rete Ferroviaria Italiana (RFI).  However, the commercial area of the passenger building is managed by Centostazioni.  Train services to and from the station are operated by Trenitalia.  Each of these companies is a subsidiary of Ferrovie dello Stato (FS), Italy's state-owned rail company.

Location
Aosta railway station is situated in the southern part of the city, a few hundred metres (yards) from the central Émile Chanoux square (town hall square), to which it is linked by Avenue Conseil des Commis.

Features
The station has recently been renovated. It is composed of a single building with ticketing, waiting rooms, a cafe bar, a bistro restaurant and a tobacconist.  A minor building, adjacent to the main one, is the headquarters of the railway police.

The station yard has eight tracks, of which five are dedicated to passenger trains, and faced by platforms equipped with steel canopies. Recently, Centrostazioni fitted the platforms and the subway to Via Paravera with illuminated signs indicating destinations and schedules.

There is no goods shed at the station.  In recent years, the only goods traffic passing through the station has been consignments of slate, widely used for roofing in the Aosta Valley, and cargoes of waste, particularly of scrap metal, from Cogne Aciers spéciaux (CAS), a steelworks located near the station.  The scrap metal was destined for foundries, and was transported several days a week by goods trains hauled by two D345 class diesel locomotives (one at each end of the train) or the new D242 class diesel locomotives.

Until 2001-2002, the station was managed in collaboration with military railway engineers (who were involved in the management of the Chivasso–Aosta railway).

Train services
The station is served by the following service:

Express services (Regionale Veloce) Turin - Chivasso – Ivrea – Aosta
Regional services (Treno regionale) Ivrea - Aosta

Passenger and train movements
The station has about one million passenger movements each year.  It is used mainly by students attending colleges in the Aosta Valley, by commuters and by tourists.

The main destinations for passengers are Turin, Chivasso, Ivrea.

Interchange
Innocent Manzetti square, in front of the station, is the terminus for the majority of Aosta's urban and suburban bus lines.

Near the square is the Georges Carrel parking station, and Aosta bus station, the terminus of the bus lines of the SAVDA company.

Gallery

See also

History of rail transport in Italy
List of railway stations in Aosta Valley
Rail transport in Italy
Railway stations in Italy

References

External links

History and pictures of Aosta railway station 
Aosta Valley Railway Museum Association website 
Les chemins de fer en Vallée d'Aoste (Tour of Mont Blanc by train) 

This article is based upon a translation of the Italian language version, and includes information from the French language version, as of December 2010.

Railway Station
Railway stations in Aosta Valley
Railway stations opened in 1886